Gosenbach is a small river of North Rhine-Westphalia and Rhineland-Palatinate, Germany. It flows into the Sieg near Mudersbach.

See also
List of rivers of North Rhine-Westphalia
List of rivers of Rhineland-Palatinate

Rivers of North Rhine-Westphalia
Rivers of Rhineland-Palatinate
Rivers of Siegerland
Rivers of Germany